Platinum and platinum group metals are produced in Zimbabwe and South Africa.  Of the multitudes of companies involved in producing platinum group metals in these two countries, these are the principal operators:

South Africa 
World's leading platinum producer.

Anglo Platinum – Anglo American plc 
Impala Platinum – Implats
Lonplats
Aquarius Platinum
African Rainbow Minerals

Zimbabwe 
Zimbabwe Platinum – Zimplats
Impala Platinum
Anglo American Platinum Company

Platinum group elements 
There are 6 platinum group elements:

Iridium 
Osmium
Palladium 
Platinum 
Rhodium
Ruthenium

See also 
Aluminium in Africa
Copper in Africa
Iron ore in Africa
Mining
Platinum group
Platinum group: sources
Titanium in Africa
Uranium in Africa

External links 
 MBendi: Mining: Africa: Platinum Group Mining
 Platinum today: South Africa

Mining in South Africa
Mining in Zimbabwe
Platinum